Plonger is a 2017 French drama film directed by Mélanie Laurent. It was screened in the Special Presentations section at the 2017 Toronto International Film Festival.

Cast
 Gilles Lellouche as César
 María Valverde as Paz Aguilera
 Ibrahim Ahmed as Marin
 Marie Denarnaud as La gérante de l'hôtel
 Noémie Merlant as La jeune artiste
 Albert Delpy as Léo

References

External links
 

2017 films
2017 drama films
French drama films
2010s French-language films
Films directed by Mélanie Laurent
2010s French films